Denel Land Systems is a division of the Denel group.

It was formerly Lyttelton Engineering Works (LIW - from ), a subsidiary part of the commercial network from Armscor. It then became the Systems division of the Land Systems Group of Denel.

They are responsible for the design and manufacture of systems ranging from artillery (such as G5 howitzer and G6 howitzer) to small arms such as the R4 assault rifle.

Products 
Rooikat - 8x8 armoured combat vehicle with a GT4  gun in turret
Badger MCV -  8x8 Multi-role armoured personnel carrier with a  gun or twin  mortars in turret
G7 - T7-52  light howitzer
G5 - T6-52  towed howitzer
G6 Rhino - T6-52  self-propelled howitzer 
G6 Marksman - G6 base vehicle combined with a British Marksman SPAAG turret
MCT 12.7 - Turret with  machine gun
LCT 20 - Turret with a GA-1  gun
LCT 30 - Turret with a GI-30  gun
MCT 30 - Turret with a GI-30  gun
LCT 30 ATGM - Turret with a GI-30  gun and four Ingwe ATGM launchers
LMT 105 - Turret with a GT7  tank gun 
T7-52 - Turret with a GT7  howitzer gun
T6-52 - Turret with a Denel 155mm Howitzer Gun  howitzer gun
T5-52 - Turret with a Denel 155mm Howitzer Gun  truck-mounted howitzer gun
MCT 60 Mortar - Turret with a M10 Mortar  mortar
MCT Missile - Turret with two Ingwe ATGM launchers
Vektor GA-1 -  gun for turrets 
Denel GI-2  gun for turrets or naval applications
Denel GI 30 -  gun for turrets
Denel 35mm Dual Purpose Gun -  naval gun close-in weapons system
Denel GT4 -  rifled gun for turrets
Denel GT7 -  light gun for turrets
Denel 155mm Howitzer Gun -  heavy gun for turrets
60/81mm Mortar Systems 
M10 Mortar -  mortar for turrets
M4 60 -  commando mortar 
M6 60 -  mortar
M8 81 -  mortar
Small arms
Vektor SP1 -  semi-automatic pistol
Vektor R1/R2/R3 -  battle rifle
Vektor R4/R5/R6 -  assault rifle
Vektor CR-21 -  bullpup assault rifle (prototype only)
Vektor Mini-SS -  light machine gun
Vektor Mini-SS Compact -  compact light machine gun
Vektor SS-77 -  medium machine gun
Vektor DMG-5 -  medium machine gun
Denel NTW-20 - ,  &  is an anti-materiel rifle
Denel Y3 AGL -  automatic grenade launcher

References

External links
 

Weapons manufacturing companies
Denel
Military vehicle manufacturers